Unterharz is a former Verwaltungsgemeinschaft ("collective municipality") in the district of Harz, in Saxony-Anhalt, Germany. It was situated in the eastern part of the Harz, south of Quedlinburg. The seat of the Verwaltungsgemeinschaft was in Harzgerode. It was disbanded on 1 August 2009.

The Verwaltungsgemeinschaft Unterharz consisted of the following municipalities:

 Dankerode 
 Güntersberge
 Harzgerode
 Königerode
 Neudorf
 Schielo 
 Siptenfelde
 Straßberg

Former Verwaltungsgemeinschaften in Saxony-Anhalt